Abdul Kadir (27 December 1948 – 4 April 2003) was an Indonesian professional footballer, who played left wing in Indonesia's national team from 1965 to 1979. Due to his agility in maneuvering the ball, Abdul Kadir got himself the nickname "The Deer". He is the record holder in terms of both appearances and goal scoring for Indonesia national football team. In December 2021, he was confirmed to have made 105 'A' appearances (111 overall) at the international level to become a member of the FIFA Century Club, the only Indonesian footballer to do so.

Playing career

Club
In the late 60s, Abdul Kadir played for Persikupa Cikupa. He won the 1969–71 Perserikatan with PSMS Medan. In the 1970s, Abdul Kadir played for Persebaya Surabaya in the Indonesian League. He won Kejuaraan Nasional PSSI (Kejurnas) in 1978 with Persebaya Surabaya.

National team
Abdul Kadir was first selected into the national team for 1965 GANEFO Games in Pyongyang, North Korea when he was 16 years old. With Indonesia he won the 1968 King's Cup in Thailand, the 1969 Merdeka Tournament in Malaysia, and the 1972 Pesta Sukan in Singapore. He and Indonesia national team also finished as runners up at the 1972 President's Cup Football Tournament. He have played more than 100 international matches and score more than 70 international goals (including non 'A' match) for Indonesia national team.

Together with Soetjipto Soentoro, Max Timisela, Iswadi Idris, and Jacob Sihasale, he was elected as a player in the Asia All Stars in 1966-1970.

After retirement
Abdul Kadir coached the Krama Yudha Tiga Berlian team and helped them finish third in the 1986 Asian Club Championship. Together with Muhammad Basri and Iswadi Idris ("Basiska"), he coached the national team for the 1990 World Cup qualifications, which turned out unsuccessful. During the latter part of his life, Abdul Kadir suffered from kidney failure and needed to undergo dialysis twice a week at the Cipto Mangunkusumo Hospital (RSCM).

Death
Kadir died in Jakarta on 4 April 2003, survived by his wife and four children as well as grandchildren.

Career statistics

International goals
Scores and results list Indonesia's goal tally first, score column indicates score after each Abdul Kadir goal.

Honours
PSMS Medan
 Perserikatan: 1969-71

Persebaya
 Perserikatan: 1975-78
 Piala Surya: 1975, 1976, 1977

Indonesia
 Merdeka Tournament: 1969
 King's Cup: 1968
 Pesta Sukan Cup: 1972
 Jakarta Anniversary Tournament: 1972

Manager
Indonesia
 King's Cup runner-up: 1984

Krama Yudha Tiga Berlian
 Galatama : 1985, 1986-1987
 Piala Liga : 1987, 1988, 1989

Records
 Indonesia national football team  all-time most appearances: 111
 Indonesia national football team  all-time top scorer: 70 goals

See also
 List of top international men's football goalscorers by country
 List of men's footballers with 100 or more international caps
 List of men's footballers with 50 or more international goals

References

1948 births
2003 deaths
People from Denpasar
Indonesian footballers
PSMS Medan players
persebaya Surabaya players
arseto F.C. players
Indonesia international footballers
Footballers at the 1970 Asian Games
FIFA Century Club
Association football wingers
Asian Games competitors for Indonesia
Sportspeople from Bali